The Dewey Lake Monster, also known as the Sister Lakes Sasquatch, in Michigan folklore, is purported to be an ape-like creature, similar to descriptions of Bigfoot, that was allegedly sighted in the summer of 1964 near Dewey Lake and Sister Lakes in Dowagiac.

Description

History
In June of 1964, the story gained national attention after local residents reported seeing a large, hairy creature with glowing eyes. Police searched the area of the alleged sightings and found nothing. Nevertheless, the reports caused curious thrill-seekers and monster-hunters to besiege the community that summer. Local entrepreneurs capitalized on the event by selling "monster getaway gas", "monster burgers" and "monster hunting kits" — with a net, flashlight, squirt gun, a mallet and a stake.

Several zoologists suggested that people may have misidentified a bear or gorilla. Cass County Sheriff Robert Dool and conservation officer William Rowe dismissed speculations of a monster. Within a week, the hysteria diminished, and the South Bend Tribune reported that "nobody seems frightened anymore".

In a 1983 retrospective, the South Bend Tribune suggested that the monster was imagined by intoxicated strawberry pickers. Steve Arseneau of the Dowagiac Area History Museum said, "I view it more as a rural legend. Perhaps some people saw something, and their imaginations got the better of them".

Popular culture
In 2016, the annual Dewey Lake Boat Parade celebrated the Dewey Lake Monster legend.
Local brewery Sister Lakes Brewing named a beer after the Dewey Lake Monster.

References 

American folklore
Michigan folklore
Bigfoot
American legendary creatures